Malte Kaufmann (born 14 December 1976) is a German economist, entrepreneur and politician from the AfD. He has been Member of the German Bundestag for since 2021.

Political career 
In the 2021 German federal election, he contested Heidelberg, but came in fifth place. He was elected on the state list.

References

See also 

 List of members of the 20th Bundestag

1976 births
Living people
Members of the Bundestag for the Alternative for Germany
21st-century German politicians
Members of the Bundestag for Baden-Württemberg
Members of the Bundestag 2021–2025

Politicians from Heidelberg